Scelotes poensis is a species of small skink endemic to the coastal forests of Bioko, such as the regions around Malabo. The species has potentially also been sighted in the coastal forests of Cameroon. The species is also known as the Fernando Po Burrowing Skink, after the historic name for Bioko.

No physical examples nor images of the species exist. Furthermore, despite this name, it is debated whether the animal is terrestrial or fossorial. It is, however, know that the average adult of the species weighs 9.77g and that the species lacks both forelimbs and hindlimbs.

References

poensis
Reptiles described in 1895
Taxa named by José Vicente Barbosa du Bocage